Anthobium is a genus of beetles belonging to the family Staphylinidae.

The genus was first described by Leach in 1819.

Synonyms:
 Lathrimaeum Erichson, 1839
 Eudeliphrum Champion, 1920

Species:
 Anthobium atrocephalum
 Anthobium melanocephalum

References

Omaliinae
Staphylinidae genera